Bowthorpe Oak in Manthorpe near Bourne, Lincolnshire, England is perhaps England's oldest oak tree with an estimated age of over 1,000 years.

The tree can be found on Bowthorpe Park Farm. 'Bowthorpe' is the name of a deserted medieval village. The farm offers pre-booked private tours of the tree. The hollow interior of the trunk had been fitted with seats and has apparently been used as a dining room for 20 people in the past. The tree has now been fenced to protect the roots from soil compaction.

The oak was selected as one of 50 Great British Trees picked by The Tree Council in 2002 to spotlight trees in Great Britain in honour of the Golden Jubilee of Elizabeth II. The Bowthorpe Oak is featured in The Guinness Book of Records and was filmed for a short TV documentary about its size. It also appeared in the 2017 documentary Oak Tree: Nature's Greatest Survivor, hosted by George McGavin about the life of oak trees.

It was a filming location for the 2011 film Hollow, directed by Michael Axelgaard.

See also
 List of Great British Trees
 List of individual trees

References

External links

 Bowthorpe Park Farm
 Officially recorded information on the Ancient Tree Hunt
Woodland Trust notes

Individual oak trees
Environment of Lincolnshire
History of Lincolnshire
South Kesteven District
Individual trees in England